A Time for Singing is a musical with music by John Morris, lyrics by Gerald Freedman and John Morris, and a book by Freedman and Morris. The work was based on Richard Llewellyn's novel of a Welsh mining village, How Green Was My Valley. The show takes place in the memory of Protestant minister David Griffith, recalling conflict within the Morgan family over the possible formation of a miners' union within the village, and the romance between Griffith himself and Angharad of the Morgans, who ultimately marries the mine owner instead.
The show starred Ivor Emmanuel (as David Griffith), Tessie O'Shea, Shani Wallis and Laurence Naismith.

The original Broadway production began a series of ten previews at The Broadway Theatre on May 12, 1966, and opened officially on May 21, 1966, running for a total of only 41 performances. It closed on June 25, 1966.

An Alexander H. Cohen production, it has been called "probably the best musical he ever produced." Cohen used an "extravagant publicity machine" to bring attention to the show, with the first 100 ticket buyers receiving "folding chairs and a picnic lunch catered by the Brasserie restaurant." 
Ken Mandelbaum argued that A Time for Singing pointed the way to later grand musicals like Les Misérables and Grand Hotel in both its staging and its music, which was "richer and more serious" than other shows of the period, with a "cinematic fluidity and continuous movement" that later became common in 1980s musicals.

Theatre Historian Gerald Bordman, however, acknowledged the musical's "fine choral singing" but stated that 
the music the singers were given was drab and did little to enhance the grim story of the Morgan family's tribulations".

Bing Crosby recorded two songs from A Time for Singing for Reprise Records on May 9, 1966, with the Johnny Keating Orchestra and Chorus: "Far From Home" and "How Green Was My Valley." They were released as a single. Stereo versions of the songs were released in 2010. A remastered CD of the original Broadway cast recording was issued in a limited edition by producer Bruce Kimmel on his Kritzerland label on April 3, 2013.

Song list
Act I      
Come You Men – Male Singing Chorus 
How Green Was My Valley – David Griffith and Chorus 
Old Long John – Male Singing Chorus 
Here Come Your Men – Male Singing Chorus 
What a Good Day Is Saturday – Beth Morgan, Gwillym Morgan, Angharad Morgan, Brothers and Company 
Peace Come to Every Heart – Company 
Someone Must Try – David Griffith 
Oh, How I Adore Your Name – Angharad Morgan 
That's What Young Ladies Do – David Griffith 
When He Looks At Me – Angharad Morgan 
Far From Home – Beth Morgan, Angharad Morgan, Gwillym Morgan and Brothers 
I Wonder If – Brothers 
What A Party – Gwillym Morgan, David Griffith, Cyfartha Lewis, Dai Bando and Brothers 
Let Me Love You – Angharad Morgan 
Why Would Anyone Want to Get Married? – Huw Morgan, Brothers, Beth Morgan and Gwillym Morgan 
A Time For Singing – Beth Morgan and Company 
       
Act II      
When the Baby Comes – Company 
I'm Always Wrong – Angharad Morgan 
There is Beautiful You Are – David Griffith 
Three Ships – Beth Morgan, Bronwen Jenkins, Ivor Morgan and Company 
Tell Her – Huw Morgan and Gwillym Morgan 
There Is Beautiful You Are (Reprise) – David Griffith 
Let Me Love You (Reprise) – Angharad Morgan and David Griffith 
And The Mountains Sing Back – David Griffith 
Gone in Sorrow – Company 
How Green Was My Valley (Reprise) – Company

Notes

External links
A Time for Singing on the Internet Broadway Database

Broadway musicals
Musicals based on novels
Works about mining
1966 musicals